Vernon Lewis Jr. (born October 27, 1970) is a former American football defensive back who played four seasons with the New England Patriots of the National Football League. He played college football at the University of Pittsburgh and attended Kashmere High School in Houston, Texas.

References

External links
Just Sports Stats
College stats

Living people
1970 births
Players of American football from Houston
American football defensive backs
African-American players of American football
Pittsburgh Panthers football players
New England Patriots players
21st-century African-American sportspeople
20th-century African-American sportspeople